Epischnia brevipalpella is a species of snout moth in the genus Epischnia. It was described by Ragonot in 1893. It is found in Madagascar.

References

Moths described in 1893
Phycitini
Moths of Madagascar
Moths of Africa